Baburao Narsingrao Kokate (Adaskar) (died 2016) was an Indian politician from Maharashtra and a member of the Indian National Congress. He was elected in 1972 as a member of the Legislative Assembly of Maharashtra from Kaij and also in 1978 from Chausala constituency in Beed district.

References

Year of birth missing
2016 deaths
Indian National Congress politicians from Maharashtra